Ronald Andrew Crutcher (born February 27, 1947) is an American classical musician and academic administrator who served as the 10th president of the University of Richmond from 2015 to 2021. He is also a professor of music at Richmond.

Early life

Crutcher is a Phi Beta Kappa graduate of Miami University, where he graduated cum laude. He pursued graduate studies at Yale University as a Woodrow Wilson and Ford Foundation Fellow. In 1979, he was the first cellist to receive the Doctor of Musical Arts degree from Yale. The recipient of a Fulbright Award, he is fluent in German and studied music at the University of Bonn.

Career
Crutcher moved to the University of Richmond from Wheaton College, where he worked as president from 2004 until 2014. During his 10 years at Wheaton, Crutcher's fund-raising campaign received more funds than any campaign in Wheaton’s history, raising $137.6M despite a poorly performing economy. Included in this figure is $37 million for the Mars Center and $53.3 million for scholarships, plus several million dollars for athletic facilities, career services, and faculty-mentored research. The campaign also achieved a 72 percent rate of alumni participation.

Previously, at Miami University in Oxford, Ohio, he served as provost and executive vice president for academic affairs and professor of music. Spending five years at Miami, Crutcher coordinated the First in 2009 strategic vision process for the University; established the Center for American and World Cultures; led the revamping of the first-year experience to intensify its academic rigor; and played a key role in securing a $5 million gift from an alumnus to establish a new Institute for Ethical Leadership.

Prior to his work at Miami, he served as director of the School of Music at the University of Texas at Austin (1994–99). Earlier he was vice president of academic affairs at the Cleveland Institute of Music (1990–94), and associate vice chancellor for academic affairs at the University of North Carolina at Greensboro (1987–90).

Crutcher is also the founding co-chair of the Liberal Education and America's Promise (LEAP) initiative, housed in the Association of American Colleges and Universities (AAC&U). LEAP seeks to increase the impact of a liberal arts education through its application to complex problems in the real world. In March 2021, the University of Richmond announced that Dr. Crutcher would step down as president on August 15. He was succeeded by Kevin F. Hallock, dean of the Cornell SC Johnson College of Business.

References

Living people
Miami University faculty
Miami University alumni
Yale School of Music alumni
University of Bonn alumni
Wheaton College (Massachusetts) faculty
University of Richmond faculty
Presidents of the University of Richmond
Ford Foundation fellowships
Woodward High School (Cincinnati, Ohio) alumni
1947 births
Wheaton College (Massachusetts) people